Native Communications Inc. (NCI) is a public radio network in the Canadian province of Manitoba. The network provides programming by and for Canadian First Nations was founded by Donald A. McIvor of Wabowden, Manitoba. The network mainly plays country music in order to appeal to a more general audience, while still serving the First Nations with its other programming.

NCI-FM broadcasts 24 hours a day, 7 days a week, on more than 50 FM radio transmitters located throughout Manitoba, reaching over 70 communities. Its headquarters is located at 1507 Inkster Boulevard in Winnipeg. The company also operates CIUR-FM, a youth-oriented radio station in Winnipeg which airs distinct programming from the main network, and is a new country station compared to the general NCI network.

The newest major site (on-air May 2002) includes a transmitter (2.7  watts) located near Minnedosa, servicing the Brandon and Dauphin regions. as well as one in Ontario.

References

External links
 www.ncifm.com
 
 Query the REC's Canadian station database for Native Communications Inc. stations

Canadian radio networks
First Nations radio stations in Canada
Mass media in Winnipeg
Thompson, Manitoba
Community radio organizations